Austin Smith (born November 7, 1988) is an American former professional ice hockey player. He was selected by the Dallas Stars in the 5th round (128th overall) of the 2007 NHL Entry Draft.

Playing career

A graduate of Colgate University, Smith played with the Colgate Raiders in the NCAA Men's Division I ECAC Hockey conference. In his senior year, Smith's outstanding play was recognized when he was recognized as ECAC Hockey's most valuable player and was selected to the 2011–12 ECAC Hockey First Team, as well as a Hobey Baker finalist and First Team All-American.

In March 2012 Dallas Stars has signed Austin Smith to a two-year entry-level contract. 
In this  two years Smith split between AHL and ECHL affiliates Texas Stars  and Idaho Steelheads. In AHL games he scored 2 goals with 4 assist in 38 games. In the ECHL he was the Steelheads leading scorer with 27 goals and 23 assists in 38 games in 2012–13 season.

Austin was loaned to the Liiga (Finlands Top Pro League) by the Dallas Stars in December 2013. After a successful loan period with Ässät during the latter half of the 2013–14 season, as an impending free agent with the Dallas Stars, Smith opted to remain with Pori in signing a one-year contract for the following season on January 22, 2014. After a dispute with one of the coaches which led to no discussion between the two in October 2014, ECHL team Allen Americans signed forward Austin Smith to a contract for the 2014–15 season.

In December 2014 Smith returned to Europe and signed a contract with Ravensburg Towerstars in the German second level league DEL2. In the 2015–16 season he shared with 37 goals in 40 games the top spot in the DEL2 goal scoring ranks.

Career statistics

Awards and honors

References

External links 

1988 births
Allen Americans players
American men's ice hockey forwards
Ässät players
Bolzano HC players
Colgate Raiders men's ice hockey players
Dallas Stars draft picks
Idaho Steelheads (ECHL) players
HC TWK Innsbruck players
Living people
Penticton Vees players
Texas Stars players
AHCA Division I men's ice hockey All-Americans